A United Nations referendum was held in British Cameroons on 11 February 1961 to determine whether the territory should join neighbouring Cameroon or Nigeria. This followed an earlier plebiscite in Northern Cameroon in 1959 which voted to postpone a decision. The option of independence was not on the ballot, having been opposed by Andrew Cohen, the UK representative to the UN Trusteeship Council, as well as African and anti-colonial delegations, notably by E. M. L. Endeley, who favoured integration with Nigeria, and John Ngu Foncha, who favoured (eventual) reunification with Francophone Cameroon.

The Muslim-majority Northern Cameroons saw a majority of 60% in favour of joining Nigeria, whilst the Christian-majority Southern Cameroons saw 70.5% in favour of integration with Cameroon. Northern Cameroon officially became Sardauna Province, a part of the Northern Region of Nigeria, on 1 June, whilst Southern Cameroons became West Cameroon, one of the two federated states of the Federal Republic of Cameroon, on 1 October.

Results

References

Further reading
 Nicodemus Fru Awasom. “The Reunification Question in Cameroon History: Was the Bride an Enthusiastic or a Reluctant One?” Africa Today 47, no. 2 (2000): 91–119. http://www.jstor.org/stable/4187333.

British Cameroons
Referendum
Referendums in Cameroon
Referendums in Nigeria
British Cameroon
Election and referendum articles with incomplete results
Border polls